Pool C of the First Round of the 2017 World Baseball Classic was held at Marlins Park, Miami, Florida, United States, from March 9 to 12, 2017, between Canada, Colombia, the Dominican Republic, and the United States. Pool C was a round-robin tournament. Each team played the other three teams once, with the top two teams – the Dominican Republic and the United States – advancing to Pool F, one of two second-round pools. Manny Machado of the Dominican Republic was named MVP for the first-round Pool C bracket of the WBC, after batting .357.

Standings

Pool C MVP:  Manny Machado

Results
Times from March 9 to 11 are Eastern Standard Time (UTC−05:00) and times of March 12 are Eastern Daylight Time (UTC−04:00).

Dominican Republic 9, Canada 2

United States 3, Colombia 2

Colombia 4, Canada 1

Dominican Republic 7, United States 5

The crowd of 37,446 set a baseball attendance record for Marlins Park, surpassing Opening Day of the 2014 Major League Baseball season.

Dominican Republic 10, Colombia 3

United States 8, Canada 0

References

External links
Official website

Pool C
World Baseball Classic Pool C
2010s in Miami
Baseball competitions in Miami
International baseball competitions hosted by the United States
International sports competitions in Florida
World Baseball Classic Pool C